USS Pursuit was a bark purchased at New York City on 3 September 1861; and was commissioned 17 December 1861, Acting Volunteer Lt. David Cate in command.

Service history

Assigned to the Gulf blockade 
Assigned to the East Gulf Blockading Squadron, she operated off the Florida coast, with several cruises to Cuba, during the course of the American Civil War.

Intercepting and capturing blockade runners 
Operating as named, she captured her first prize, the schooner Anna Belle, off Apalachicola, Florida 6 March 1862. In April she took the sloop La Fayette (4th) and the steamer Florida (6th), both in St. Joseph's Bay near Pensacola, Florida, and on 28 May she ran down the schooner Andromeda off the Cuban coast. On 23 June 1863 she captured the sloop Kate at the mouth of the Indian River and, at the end of December, destroyed two salt works on St. Joseph's Bay.

Final Indian River operations 
Pursuit took her final prizes, the cotton boat Peep O'Day and the British schooner Mary, in the Indian River, 4 December 1864 and 16 March 1865 respectively.

Decommissioning 
At the close of the American Civil War she returned to New York where she was decommissioned 5 June 1865 and sold 12 July 1865.

See also

Union Navy
Union Blockade

References

Ships of the Union Navy
Barques of the United States Navy
Gunboats of the United States Navy
American Civil War patrol vessels of the United States
1861 ships